The Lanzhou (Xining)–Guangzhou corridor is a partially operational high-speed railway corridor connecting Lanzhou and Xining to Guangzhou. The passage's two branches that begin Lanzhou and Xining meet at Chengdu in Sichuan Province. From Chengdu, the corridor passes through Guiyang and Guilin before ending at Guangzhou.

The rail corridor was first announced in the 11th Five Year Plan by the Chinese government, as the "Chengdu–Guangzhou high-speed railway". In 2016, it was expanded to Lanzhou and Xining, as part of the national "eight vertical and eight horizontal" high-speed railway network.

Sections

Guiyang–Guangzhou high-speed railway

Guiyang–Guangzhou high-speed railway, is a high-speed rail (HSR) line in southern China between Guiyang and Guangzhou, the provincial capitals, respectively of Guizhou and Guangdong Province. The line, also known as the Guiguang HSR, is dedicated to high speed passenger rail service. The line was built from 2008 to 2014 and opened on December 26, 2014.

The line traverses rugged karst terrain in Guizhou and Guangxi and relies on extensive bridges and tunnels, which comprise 83% of the line's total length. The travel time by train between the two terminal cities was reduced from 20 hours to 4 hours.

References

See also 
 High-speed rail in China

High-speed railway lines in China
High-speed rail in China
Rail transport in Guizhou
Rail transport in Sichuan
Rail transport in Guangdong